Saleh Ahmed (born 21 July 1997) is a first-class cricketer from Bangladesh. In December 2015 he was named in Bangladesh's squad for the 2016 Under-19 Cricket World Cup.

References

External links
 

1997 births
Living people
Bangladeshi cricketers
Barisal Division cricketers
Old DOHS Sports Club cricketers
Cricket Coaching School cricketers